Rapeman was a short-lived American noise rock band founded in 1987 and disbanded in 1989. It consisted of Steve Albini (formerly of Big Black) on guitar and vocals, David Wm. Sims (formerly of Scratch Acid and simultaneously of the Jesus Lizard) on bass and Rey Washam (formerly of Scratch Acid and Big Boys) on drums. Their sound was also described by some as post-hardcore. Rapeman were formed as a parallel sister project to The Jesus Lizard, although they outlasted Rapeman by several years.

History
Rapeman was formed in 1987 when drummer Rey Washam and bassist David Wm. Sims relocated to Chicago from Texas after the breakup of their band Scratch Acid. Steve Albini had just ended his group Big Black, and was looking to switch to a musical project with a live drummer, instead of his Roland TR-606 drum machine. 

Rapeman's initial 1988 releases included the mostly live recorded Budd EP, the "Hated Chinee b/w Marmoset" 7" single, and their sole album, Two Nuns and a Pack Mule. The band recorded in Albini's own home studio, often giving production credit to someone named Fluss, later revealed to be Albini's cat. 

All were originally released on Touch and Go Records in the US, Blast First! in the UK and Au Go Go in Australia. Rapeman left Blast First! in 1990 after Albini had an argument with the label over the release of a Big Black record. Touch and Go started distributing in the UK in 1992 and re-released Rapeman's records there.
 
The band's final record before their breakup, the "Inki's Butt Crack" 7" single, was issued in 1989, as part of the Sub Pop Singles Club.

Name controversy
The band's name was controversial. For the 1994 book, Rock Names by Adam Dolgins, Albini revealed that "Rapeman is ... the title character in a Japanese comic book that I had come across through a friend of mine. The comic book is just a total mind-bender. There's a whole genre of comics in Japan, rape stories where women are raped in really graphic detail for whatever reason". Albini and drummer Washam became "sort of obsessed" with the comic, and named their new group after the titular satirical anti-hero.

According to Albini, Rapeman's first American tour garnered negative press response and protests at several of their gigs solely from the band's name.

In a Kreative Kontrol podcast in 2014, bass guitarist Sims discussed always having issues with the name, saying it was "the biggest musical regret" of his life.

In an April 2020 interview on the Conan Neutron's Protonic Reversal podcast, Albini expressed regret for the name of the band, saying that he did not feel he had been "held to account for being in a band called Rapeman". He added that "it was a flippant choice", calling it unconscionable and indefensible. He later likened it to getting a bad tattoo.

In October 2021 he again addressed the mistakes he felt he'd make on this Twitter account. "A lot of things I said and did from an ignorant position of comfort and privilege are clearly awful and I regret them. It's nobody's obligation to overlook that, and I do feel an obligation to redeem myself...". He added, "I expect no grace, and honestly feel like I and others of my generation have not been held to task enough for words and behavior that ultimately contributed to a coarsening society."

Later projects
Albini later played bass with Flour before going on to form Shellac and expanding his work as a recording engineer. Sims reunited with ex-Scratch Acid vocalist David Yow to form the Jesus Lizard (with Albini recording their albums). Washam went on to drum for former Chrome guitarist Helios Creed.

Discography

Studio albums
 Two Nuns and a Pack Mule (1988, Touch and Go Records/Blast First!/Au Go Go) UK Indie No. 4

Singles and EPs
 Budd EP (1988, Touch and Go/Blast First!/Au Go Go) UK Indie No. 2
 "Hated Chinee" 7" single (1988, Touch and Go/Blast First!/Au Go Go)
 "Inki's Butt Crack" 7" single (1989, Sub Pop Singles Club)

Compilation appearances
 Nothing Short Of Total War (Part One) (Blast First) (1987) - "Dutch Courage"
 The Devil's Jukebox (Blast First) (1989) - "Dutch Courage"
 Indie Top 20 Vol. VI-Pride Of Independents (Beechwood) (1989) - "Bud(d)"
 Au-Go-Go sampler #1 cassette (Au Go Go) (1989) - "Hated Chinee"

References

American noise rock music groups
American post-hardcore musical groups
Musical groups from Chicago
Obscenity controversies in music
Musical groups established in 1987
Musical groups disestablished in 1989
Touch and Go Records artists
American musical trios
Blast First artists